Mark Jackson (born 21 December 1980) is a New Zealand short track speed skater. He competed in three events at the 2002 Winter Olympics.

References

External links
 

1980 births
Living people
New Zealand male short track speed skaters
Olympic short track speed skaters of New Zealand
Short track speed skaters at the 2002 Winter Olympics
Sportspeople from Christchurch